The Burkina Faso women's national football team is the representative women's association football team of Burkina Faso. Its governing body is the Burkinabé Football Federation (FBF) and it competes as a member of the Confederation of African Football (CAF).

The national team's first activity was in 2007, when they competed at the Tournoi de Cinq Nations held in Ouagadougou. On 2 September, Burkina Faso played their first match against Niger winning both games, Burkina Faso Made it to the final in their debut year and lost to Mali in the final. Burkina Faso is currently ranked 140th in the FIFA Women's World Rankings.

Record per opponent
Key

The following table shows Burkina Faso' all-time official international record per opponent:

Results

2007

2014

2016

2017

2018

2019

2021

2022

See also
 Burkina Faso national football team results

References

External links
 Burkina Faso results on The Roon Ba
  Burkina Faso results on Globalsports
 Burkina Faso results on worldfootball.net

2010s in Burkina Faso
2020s in Burkina Faso
Women's national association football team results